Carolyn Jean Spellmann Shoemaker (June 24, 1929 – August 13, 2021) was an American astronomer and a co-discoverer of Comet Shoemaker–Levy 9. She discovered 32 comets (then a record for the most by an individual) and more than 500 asteroids.

Having earned degrees in history, political science, and English literature, she had little interest in science until she met and married geologist Eugene Merle Shoemaker. Her career in astronomy began when she demonstrated good stereoscopic vision, a particularly valuable quality for looking for objects in near-Earth space. Despite the fact that her degrees were not in science, having that visual ability motivated the California Institute of Technology (Caltech) to hire her as a research assistant on a team led by her husband. She went on to making record-setting discoveries in the field of astronomy, as well as being awarded honorary degrees and many profession awards.

Personal life 
Shoemaker was born on June 24, 1929, in Gallup, New Mexico, to Hazel and Leonard Spellmann. Her family then moved to Chico, California, where she and her brother Richard grew up. She earned bachelor's and master's degrees in history, political science, and English literature from Chico State.

When her brother attended Caltech, his roommate was a young graduate student named Eugene "Gene" Shoemaker. Carolyn first met him  in the summer of 1950 at her brother's wedding. After graduating, Shoemaker had moved to New Jersey to begin work toward his doctoral degree at Princeton University. He had flown back to California to serve as Richard's best man. When Shoemaker returned to his studies at Princeton, Carolyn and he maintained a pen pal relationship and later both attended a two-week camping trip on the Cumberland Plateau. They were married on August 18, 1951 and had three children: Christy, Linda, and Patrick (Pat).

The Shoemaker family lived in Grand Junction, Colorado, Menlo Park, California, and Pasadena, California, before settling down in Flagstaff, Arizona, where she and her husband worked together at the Lowell Observatory. In 1997, Carolyn and Gene were involved in a car crash in Australia. Gene was killed instantly, while Carolyn sustained severe injuries.

Shoemaker died at age 92, after a fall on August 13, 2021.

Careers 

Shortly after her marriage, the first job she held was teaching the seventh grade. Unsatisfied with the teaching profession, she quit to raise a family. Mary Chapman, author of Shoemaker's biography for the USGS Astrogeology Center, wrote "Carolyn is a warm, caring, and extremely patient woman, but her skills were better suited for a non-teaching environment." After her children had grown up and moved out, Shoemaker sought work. In her youth, she had never been interested in scientific topics. She had taken one course in geology, but found it extremely boring. However, she reportedly told others that, "listening to Gene explaining geology made what she had thought was a boring subject into an exciting and interesting pursuit of knowledge".

At the suggestion of her husband, she began studying astronomy from a student at Lowell Observatory. Then she began working as a field assistant for her husband. She worked on his search program mapping and analyzing impact craters.

Carolyn Shoemaker started her astronomical career in 1980, at age 51, searching for Earth-crossing asteroids and comets at California Institute of Technology, Pasadena, California, and the Palomar Observatory, San Diego, California. That year, Shoemaker was hired at the United States Geological Survey (USGS) as a visiting scientist in the astronomy branch, and then in 1989 began work as an astronomy research professor at Northern Arizona University. She concentrated her work on searching for comets and planet-crossing asteroids. Teamed with astronomer David H. Levy, the Shoemakers identified Shoemaker-Levy 9, a fragmented comet with an orbit that intersected that of Jupiter, on March 24, 1993.

In the 1980s and 1990s, Shoemaker used film taken at the wide-field telescope at the Palomar Observatory, combined with a stereoscope, to find objects that moved against the background of fixed stars.

Following recovery from the injuries she suffered in the 1997 automobile crash in which her husband was killed, she resumed her work at the Lowell Observatory with Levy. She was actively involved in astronomical observation work until at least 2002.  Shoemaker had been credited with discovering or co-discovering 32 comets and over 500 asteroids.

Awards and honors 
The Hildian asteroid 4446 Carolyn, discovered by colleague Edward Bowell at Lowell Observatory in 1985, was named in her honor. In 1988, Shoemaker received the Rittenhouse Medal of the Rittenhouse Astronomical Society. In 1995, she received the Scientist of the Year Award, also from the Rittenhouse Astronomical Society.

In 1996, Shoemaker received an honorary doctorate degree from the Northern Arizona University, Flagstaff, Arizona and the U.S. National Aeronautics and Space Administration Exceptional Scientific Achievement Medal. In 1998, the U.S. National Academy of Sciences named both of the Shoemakers as the recipients of the James Craig Watson Medal.

List of discovered minor planets 

 Shoemaker is tied with Takeshi Urata for  place on the Minor Planet Center's list of most discoveries with 377 numbered minor planets between the years 1980 and 1994.

References

External links 
 

American women astronomers
Women planetary scientists
Discoverers of asteroids
Discoverers of comets
1929 births
2021 deaths
People from Gallup, New Mexico
California State University, Chico alumni
Northern Arizona University faculty
Palomar Observatory
People from Flagstaff, Arizona
20th-century American astronomers
21st-century American astronomers

20th-century American women scientists
21st-century American women scientists
Planetary scientists
American women academics